Bad Communication is the first mini-album by the Japanese rock duo B'z, released in 1989. The song was the first hit song for B'z. The album also includes the band's first two "E-Style" versions of previous hits—in this case "Out of the Rain" and "Dakara Sono Te Wo Hanashite", both from their debut album. It charted on number 12 at the weekly albums chart list by Oricon, and by 1992 was certified as a million seller by RIAJ.

The song was remade four times: an edited "E-Style" version with English lyrics which appeared on Wicked Beat and B'z The Best "Pleasure", the "(000-18)" bluesy unplugged version for the album Loose, and one version called "-Ultra Pleasure Style-" as opening of B'z The Best "Ultra Pleasure".

The song is played very often in concert.

Track listing 
"Bad Communication" – 7:25
"Out of the Rain" (E-Style) – 7:41
"Dakara sono te wo hanashite" (E-Style) – 7:19

Certifications

External links 
 
Bad Communication on B'z no bise(Translation in French / Traduction en français)

B'z EPs
1989 debut EPs
Japanese-language EPs